David Joy (born December 11, 1983) is an American novelist and short-story writer.

Career
David Joy is the author of the Edgar Award-nominated novel Where All Light Tends To Go (G. P. Putnam's Sons, 2015), as well as the novels The Weight Of This World (G. P. Putnam's Sons, 2017), The Line That Held Us (G. P. Putnam's Sons, 2018), and When These Mountains Burn (G. P. Putnam's Sons, 2020). He is also the author of the memoir Growing Gills: A Fly Fisherman's Journey (Bright Mountain Books, 2011), which was a finalist for the Reed Environmental Writing Award and the Ragan Old North State Award.

Joy is the recipient of an artist fellowship from the North Carolina Arts Council. His writing has appeared in numerous magazines and journals, such as Garden & Gun, Time, and The New York Times Magazine.

His novel Where All Light Tends to Go will be made into a film directed by Ben Young and starring Billy Bob Thornton and Robin Wright.

Personal life
He lives in the Little Canada community of Jackson County, North Carolina.

List of works

Novels
 Where All Light Tends to Go (G. P. Putnam's Sons, 2015)
 The Weight of This World (G. P. Putnam's Sons, 2017)
 The Line That Held Us (G. P. Putnam's Sons, 2018)
 When These Mountains Burn (G. P. Putnam's Sons, 2020)
 Those We Thought We Knew (G. P. Putnam's Sons, 2023)

Nonfiction
 Growing Gills: A Fly Fisherman's Journey (2011)
 Gather At The River: Twenty-Five Authors On Fishing Eds. David Joy and Eric Rickstad (2019)

Short Stories
 “Stink Bait.” Writer's Bone (March 10, 2016).
 “Burning Off Into Forever.” Appalachia Now: Short Stories of Contemporary Appalachia. Eds. Larry Smith and Charles Dodd White. Huron, OH: Bottom Dog Press, 2015. 40–46.
 “What Cannot Be Carried Alone.” Still: The Journal, Issue 18 (Spring 2015).
 “The Line That Held Us.” Pisgah Review, 7.1 (Winter 2013): 26–34. 
 “The Stars Shall Withdraw Their Shining.” Flycatcher, No. 3 (Summer/Fall 2013).

Essays

 “Song Of The Woods.” Garden & Gun (June/July 2022): 128-133.
 "Light In The Dark." Garden & Gun (Oct./Nov. 2021): 116-119.
 “Boss Hen.” Garden & Gun (Oct./Nov. 2020): 106-109.
 “Dreaming Of Monster Fish.” Garden & Gun (June/July 2019): 114–121.
 "Hunting Camp." Time (August 6, 2018).
 "At The Crossroads. The New York Times Magazine (April 8, 2018): 48–53.
 "Good Dog: Mutually Reclusive." Garden & Gun (Dec. 2017/Jan. 2018): 87–90.
 "A Charlotte Native Remembers Fish Camps." Charlotte Magazine (November 2017): 54–59.
 "Digging In The Trash." The Bitter Southerner. 2 May 2017.
 “On Darkness." Criminal Element. 13 March 2017.
 “This Caravan Rolls On." The Quivering Pen. 6 March 2017.
 “My Privilege, Our Problem." Charlotte Magazine. 22 Sept. 2016.
 “One Place misUnderstood.” The Huffington Post (reprint). 23 June 2016.
 “One Place misUnderstood.” Writer’s Bone. 21 June 2016.
 “The Last Hotdog I Ever Ate.” Charlotte Magazine (October 2015): 37–40.
 “The Man Who Carried Snakes.” The Good Men Project. 15 August 2015.
 “The Long Row.” Drafthorse Literary Journal 1.2 (Summer 2012).
 “Creatures of Fire.” Smoky Mountain Living 10.3 (Summer 2010): 44–47.
 “Sound of Silence.” Smoky Mountain Living 10.1 (Winter 2010): 42–45.
 “Native.” Smoky Mountain Living 9.4 (Summer 2009): 54–56.
 “Breaking in the Cork.” Wilderness House Literary Review 4.1 (Spring 2009): 1–9.
 “Tired and Feathered.” Bird Watcher's Digest 31.2 (Nov/Dec 2008): 80–82.

Translations
 Là où les lumières se perdent. France: Sonatine Editions, 2016. (French; first edition)
 Le Poids du monde. France: Sonatine Editions, 2018. (French; first edition)
 Wo Alle Lichter Enden. Germany: Polar Verlag, 2019. (German; first edition)
 Ojo Por Ojo. Spain: RBA Libros, 2020. (Spanish; first edition)
 Ce Lien Entre Nous. France: Sonatine Editions, 2020. (French; first edition)
 Nos Vies En Flammes. France: Sonatine Editions, 2022. (French; first edition)
 Queste Montagne Bruciano. Italy: Jimenez, 2022.(Italian, first edition)
 Montañas En Llamas. Spain: RBA Libros, 2022. (Spanish; first edition)

Awards
 2022 Prix Saint-Maur En Poche du Roman Étranger (Ce Lien Entre Nous)
 2020 Dashiell Hammett Prize for Literary Excellence in Crime Writing (When These Mountains Burn)
 2019 St. Francis College Literary Prize Finalist (The Line That Held Us)
 2019 Southern Book Prize (The Line That Held Us)
 2018 WCSA Tillie Olsen Award for Creative Writing (The Weight Of This World)
 2017 Le Prix du Balai de Bronze for Là Où Les Lumières Se Perdent (Where All Light Tends To Go)
 2017 International Dublin Literary Award Longlist for Where All Light Tends To Go'
 2016 Edgar Award Finalist for Best First Novel
 2016 Macavity Awards Finalist for Best First Novel
 2015 SIBA Pat Conroy Book Award Finalist, The Lords of Discipline Thriller Prize
 2015 Thomas Wolfe Memorial Literary Award Finalist
 2012 Ragan Old North State Award Finalist
 2012 Reed Environmental Writing Award Finalist
 2011 Roosevelt-Ashe Conservation Award Finalist

Interviews
Interviews with the author.

 Los Angeles Review of Books (September 24, 2018)
 NPR Weekend Edition with Lulu Garcia-Navarro (August 12, 2018)
 WUNC North Carolina Public Radio's "The State Of Things" with Frank Stasio (August 10, 2018)
 PANK Magazine (September 19, 2017)
 NPR Weekend Edition Sunday with Lulu Garcia-Navarro (July 23, 2017)
 The Huffington Post (March 30, 2017)
 Georgia Public Broadcasting's "On Second Thought" (March 13, 2017)
 WREK 91.1 Atlanta's "North Avenue Lounge" (March 13, 2017)
 Mystery Tribune (Feb. 17, 2017)
 Nyctalopes (Sept. 26, 2016)
 Huffington Post (March 9, 2015)
 Kirkus Reviews (March 6, 2015)
 Appalachian Heritage (Feb. 6, 2015)
 Southern Literary Review (March 3, 2015)
 Watauga Democrat (Feb. 11, 2015)
 Writer's Bone (March 3, 2015)
 Entropy Magazine (March 1, 2015)
 Largehearted Boy (March 3, 2015)
 Chapter 16 (April 22, 2015)
 WUNC North Carolina Public Radio (March 11, 2015)
 Smoky Mountain News (March 3, 2015)
 Citizen Times (Feb. 28, 2015)

Television Appearances
 France 5, "La Grande Librairie," (September 23, 2020)
 University of Delaware's National Agenda Series, "As We Stand Divided" (September 20, 2017)
 Alabama Public Television, "Book Mark" (March 7, 2017)
 Arizona PBS, "Books & Co." (May 21, 2015)

References

1983 births
Living people
Appalachian writers
American male novelists
Writers from Charlotte, North Carolina